Burnout Crash! (branded Burnout CRASH!) is a downloadable action racing video game in the Burnout series. It is developed by Criterion Games and published by Electronic Arts for PlayStation 3, Xbox 360, iOS via PlayStation Network, Xbox Live Arcade, and iTunes App Store.

In Burnout Crash!, players drive into an intersection and attempt to cause as big a pile-up as possible. Unlike previous games in the series, Burnout Crash! is played from a bird's-eye or aerial view. Points are earned for causing damage and destroying the environment and other vehicles. Leaderboards powered by EA's Autolog service enable players to compare scores with other players.

The game features three game modes and six different intersections to play, as well as seven drivable vehicles, for example the Vegas Saloon. The Xbox 360 version of the game also includes a Kinect mode, allowing players to use gestures to control the game.

To date, Burnout Crash! was the last title in the series before much of Criterion's staff transitioned over to working on the Need for Speed series, while the remaining staff provide additional work on non-racing game titles.

Reception

The iOS version received "favorable" reviews, while the PlayStation 3 and Xbox 360 versions received "average" reviews according to video game review aggregator Metacritic.GamePro gave the PlayStation 3 and Xbox 360 versions three-and-a-half stars out of five, saying, "This top-down arcade game based on Burnouts Crash mode is addictive, but it could've used a little more focus on mindless carnage and less on planning and repetition." The A.V. Club gave the Xbox 360 version a C, saying, "Turning Crash Mode into a dedicated game is, in theory, a good idea—no doubt some Burnout fans are salivating even as they read this—but the execution feels half-assed and thin." Edge gave the same Xbox 360 version a score of four out of ten, saying, "Kinect adds little to the package, reducing precision thanks to increased input lag and adding to sense of Burnout Crash! as a gimmick rather than a worthy investment of 800 Microsoft points. As an interim project, it's good to see Criterion still interested in its most beloved IP, but it’s just a shame there’s so little of interest in the game itself."

References

External links
 

2011 video games
Burnout (series)
Criterion Games games
IOS games
Kinect games
PlayStation 3 games
PlayStation Network games
Video games developed in the United Kingdom
Xbox 360 games
Xbox 360 Live Arcade games